Helobdella is a genus of leeches in the family Glossiphoniidae, the freshwater jawless leeches. They occur worldwide.

These are small, flat leeches which do not feed on blood.

Several species in this genus are used as model organisms in the study of developmental biology.

It has been difficult to define species in this genus without DNA analysis. Like other leeches in this family, some Helobdella species are polymorphic, coming in different colors and patterns. On the other hand, some uniformly colored species are actually cryptic species complexes that may be divided into separate species with genetic analysis.

As of 2004 there were approximately 40 described species, with species being described and reclassified continually.

Species include:
Helobdella austinensis
Helobdella chaquensis
Helobdella cordobensis
Helobdella cryptica
Helobdella duplicata
Helobdella elongata

Helobdella longicollis
Helobdella malvinensis
Helobdella michaelseni
Helobdella modesta
Helobdella paranensis
Helobdella pichipanan
Helobdella obscura
Helobdella robusta
Helobdella similis
Helobdella stagnalis
Helobdella triserialis
Helobdella virginiae
Helobdella wodzickiorum
Helobdella xenoica

References

External link

Leeches